Claregate is a suburb of Wolverhampton, West Midlands, England.  It is north west of Wolverhampton city centre, within the Tettenhall Regis ward.

History
As a distinct residential area, Claregate has only existed since the pre and post war housing estate was built between the Codsall and Aldersley roads. It is bounded on the north east side by the rail line from Wolverhampton to Shrewsbury, on the south east side by the Staffordshire and Worcestershire Canal and on the west side by the ridge that rises up to Tettenhall village. The origins of the name are unknown, though a 13th-century source names a place called 'Clare' in the area.

Today
Claregate is a thriving suburb situated between Tettenhall, Pendeford and Aldersley. The area is majority housing, with shopping areas, pubs and a school. The area also forms part of the route of the Wolverhampton Marathon.

Amenities
The focal point of the area is the traffic island between Codsall Road, Pendeford Avenue, Blackburn Avenue and Knights Avenue. Here, a cluster of businesses are located including an Esso Filling Station (formerly BP, Murco and Jet before that) – and originally named Claregate Garage, Evergreen Hairdressers, Esha's Boutique, Greedy Pig sandwich shop and Cut 'N' Dry barbers.

There are also shopping parades at the junction of Green Lane and Blakeley Avenue with a Premier convenience store, the Sunrise Chinese take-away and a children's nursery amongst other businesses, and Tettenhall Hardware, a Co-operative Food store, the Roma Wines off-licence and two fish and chip take-aways are situated on Pendeford Avenue at its junction with Green Lane.

Education
Claregate has one school, Claregate Primary School, situated on Chester Avenue.

Claregate Playing Fields
Claregate has a large playing field that is used for cricket and football, as well as hosting tennis courts and a children's playground. In June 2013, the park was saved for future generations when it was unveiled as one of six Wolverhampton parks to be designated a Queen Elizabeth II Field.

Adjacent to the playing fields is Claregate Pavilion. It provides changing room facilities to clubs which use the playing fields. It is also home to Sugar n Spice, an activity group for girls aged over nine years. Sugar n Spice was founded in 1975.

Public houses
Claregate has two long established pubs, the first formerly called 'The Fieldhouse', but now sharing the area's name, 'The Claregate', on Codsall Road. The other is The Pilot, situated on Green Lane. In 2012, Marston's Brewery announced plans to construct a mini Tesco supermarket on land that currently forms part of The Claregate pub's car park. The scheme faced opposition from a local campaign group called Residents Against Marston's Proposals (RAMP), but was approved in November 2012 on the condition that the store close at 10pm (although currently (2018) opens 7am to 11pm), and a pedestrian crossing be installed on Codsall Road.

Micropub
The first micropub in the West Midlands resides in the centre of Claregate alongside the traffic island at Pendeford Avenue. Approval was granted by city planning chiefs in June 2013. The pub, ran by Essington based Morton Brewery, is called 'Hail to the Ale' and serves only ale, cider and fruit wines. It received its premises licence in August 2013 despite some opposition from local residents, opening its doors on 5 September 2013, and proved immediately popular with drinkers. It has since won several CAMRA accolades including City Pub of the Year [2015-2018], County Pub of the Year [2015 & 2017], Region Pub of the Year [2015] and Wolverhampton Cider Pub of the Year [2018]. The building was previously an antique furniture shop called 'Anything Goes', but is best known locally as the Claregate Post Office.

References

Areas of Wolverhampton